Plášťovce is a village and municipality in the Levice District in the Nitra Region of Slovakia.

History
In historical records the village was first mentioned in 1156. In 1552 a locally significant battle between the Ottomans and Hungarian forces has happened here. The Hungarian army consisted of Italian and German mercenaries /8500 strength/, Czech infantry, Hungarians Hajdus, the city defence forces from the mining towns and local military units. They were defeated, 4000 taken prisoner and the captain taking to Istanbul where he was executed.

Geography
The village lies at altitude of 155 metres and covers an area of 50,509 km2. It has a population of about 1720 people.

Ethnicity
The village is approximately 30% Slovak and 70% Magyar.

Facilities
The village has a public library a gym and football pitch.

Places of interest

Roman Catholic church, 1898.
Manor, 18th century, baroque style. It was rebuilt to neoclassicistic style in the beginning of the 19th century. It is a Roman Catholic school.
Volksmuseum

Twin towns — sister cities
  - Kose Parish, Estonia
  - Ócsa, Hungary

External links
http://www.statistics.sk/mosmis/eng/run.html
http://www.plastovce.sk
http://www.pht.eoldal.hu/
http://www.pht.estranky.sk
 https://www.valka.cz/12222-Turecke-vojenske-vyboje-na-uzemi-dnesneho-Slovenska-I-

Villages and municipalities in Levice District